Giddy Green is a small hamlet in Dorset, England to the west of the village of Wool.

External links
National Library of Scotland: UK Ordnance Survey 6-inch map of Giddy Green, 1937-1961.

Hamlets in Dorset